Trapania orteai is a species of sea slug, a dorid nudibranch, a marine gastropod mollusc in the family Goniodorididae.

Distribution
This species was first described from the Straits of Gibraltar. It has also been reported from Sant'Agnello, Napoli, Italy.

Description
The body of this goniodorid nudibranch is translucent white in colour, with elongate orange spots. The rhinophores and gills are yellow-brown and there is a patch of orange grading to yellow on the tail. The oral tentacles and lateral papillae are yellow with white bases and a hint of orange at the base of the yellow.

Ecology
Trapania orteai probably feeds on Entoprocta which often grow on sponges.

References

Goniodorididae
Gastropods described in 1989